The Stari Han is a former caravanserai in Kremna, Užice municipality, southwestern Serbia. It was listed as a Cultural Monument of Exceptional Importance.

History
The Stari Han was established in the first two decades of the 19th century. It belonged to the Moljković family from Herzegovina. At that time, it was located on the trade route between Užice and Višegrad, one of the two major links between Bosnia and Serbia.

Architecture
The Han was built on a rectangular base on a sloping land. The lower floor hosts a stone warehouse, while the upper floor has several rooms for accommodating the travellers. Opposite the entrance hall, the building has a corbelled prominent part of typical Blakan architecture. The four-sided roof is covered with wood shingles.

Gallery

References

Caravanserais in the Balkans
19th-century establishments in Serbia
Užice
Cultural Monuments of Exceptional Importance (Serbia)